Christopher George Henderson (19 August 1857 – 21 January 1933) was an English-born Australian politician. Born in Bedlington, he received a primary education before migrating to Australia in 1885. He was a coal miner in New South Wales and general secretary of the Illawarra Miners' Union. He moved to Western Australia around 1900, becoming a coal miner at Collie and serving on Collie Municipal Council. In 1903, he was elected to the Australian Senate as a Labor Senator for Western Australia. He served as Chairman of Committees from 1914 to 1917. Henderson left the Labor Party in the wake of the 1916 split over conscription, joining the new Nationalist Party. He remained a Nationalist Senator until his defeat in 1922. Henderson died in 1933.

References

1857 births
1933 deaths
Australian Labor Party members of the Parliament of Australia
Nationalist Party of Australia members of the Parliament of Australia
Members of the Australian Senate for Western Australia
Members of the Australian Senate
Australian coal miners
Australian trade unionists
National Labor Party members of the Parliament of Australia
20th-century Australian politicians